The Lordship of Albarracín was an independent Christian lordship in the Kingdom of Aragón located in and around the city of Albarracín. Its location was a buffer wedged between the Kingdom of Aragón and the Kingdom of Castile. The Señorío was created after the partition of the Taifa of Albarracín belonging to the Berber line of Banu Razín.

History

Establishment 
In 1167, under the pressure from the ongoing wars between the Almoravid Dynasty and the new invasions of the Almohad Caliphate, the Moorish King Muhammad ibn Mardanis (nicknamed the Wolf King), ceded the Taifa of Albarracín to a vassal of Sancho VI of Navarre, a noble from Estella-Lizarra named Pedro Ruiz de Azagra. The title was granted to d'Azagra due to his support of the Navarrese Crown against Alfonso VIII of Castile and Alfonso I of Aragón (Alfonso the Battler).

In 1172, Pero Ruíz d'Azagra managed to consolidate his power over the Señorío making that territory independent of the other Christian Kingdoms in the region. In 1190, with the signing of the Borja Accords, between Alfonso II of Aragon and Sancho VI of Navarre, the two monarchs agreed to a defensive pact against Alfonso VIII of Castile which gave official legitimacy to the Sinyoría d'Albarrazín with respect to the two kingdoms.

Troubles with the Kingdom of Aragón 
In 1220, Albarracín became one of the scenes of the First Noble Revolt Against James I of Aragón, a revolt that was fostered by Rodrigo de Lizana with the help of Pedro Fernández de Azagra, the contemporary Señor of Albarracín. James I of Aragón decided to besiege the city that same year but lifted the siege after he failed to gain significant support from his nobility.

Conquest of the Taifa of Valencia 
The House of Azagra remained out of favor with the Crown of Aragón until the Reconquista of Valencia in which they collaborated with the Aragonese Crown. In 1233, they participated in the conquest of Valencia. One of the major battles the Señorío contributed its forces to was the Siege of Burriana which resulted in a victory for Aragon over the Zayyan ibn Mardanish and the Taifa of Valencia.

Downfall and integration into the Kingdom of Aragón 
The House of Azagra remained dominant in the region for six generations thanks to the support received from the Kingdom of Aragon. In 1281, with the signing of the Treaty of d'Ágreda by Peter III of Aragon and Alfonso X of Castile came to an agreement and Aragon was free to pursue territorial expansion in the region of Albarrazín and elsewhere. In 1284, the Sinyoría d'Albarrazín was conquered by the Kingdom of Aragon after a lengthy siege lasting from April to September of that year. Attempts to recover the lands by the contemporary lord, Juan Núñez I de Lara, who decided to pursue an alliance with the Kingdom of France, were defeated. Peter III of Aragon, upon capturing the city, gave it as a gift to his illegitimate child with Inés Zapata, Ferdinand of Aragon.

In 1300, James II of Aragon incorporated the lands and city of Albarracín into his dominion as a titled city.

The Lords of Albarrasí

References 
 Much of the information on this page was translated from its Spanish, Catalan, and Aragonese equivalents.

Bibliography 
 Historia del Señorío de Albarracín (José Luis Castán Esteban) (In Spanish)

Crown of Aragon
1167 establishments in Europe
1300 disestablishments in Europe
Albarracin
12th-century establishments in Aragon
13th-century disestablishments in Spain